In the United States, MIT usually refers to the Massachusetts Institute of Technology, a university in Cambridge, Massachusetts.

MIT may also refer to:

Institutes of Technology 
 Machakos Institute of Technology, a college in Machakos, Kenya 

 Madras Institute of Technology an engineering college in Chennai, Tamil Nadu, India (one of the four constituent colleges of Anna University, Chennai)
 Maebashi Institute of Technology, a college in Maehashi, Gunma, Japan
 Maharaja Institute of Technology, an engineering and management university in Arasur, Coimbatore, Tamil Nadu, India
 Maharashtra Institute of Technology, a university in Pune, Maharashtra, India
 Mallabhum Institute of Technology an Engineering college in Bishnupur, West Bengal
 Mandalay Institute of Technology, renamed to Mandalay Technological University
 Manipal Institute of Technology, an engineering college in Manipal, Karnataka, India under Manipal University
 Manukau Institute of Technology, a tertiary institute in Auckland, New Zealand
 Mapúa Institute of Technology, a tertiary institute in Manila, Philippines
 Marathwada Institute of Technology an institute in Aurangabad, Maharashtra, India
 Melbourne Institute of Technology, a Private Higher Education Provider in Australia
 Milwaukee Institute of Technology, 1951–1968, predecessor of Milwaukee Area Technical College in Milwaukee, Wisconsin, US
 Misamis Institute of Technology, Ozamiz City, Philippines, maritime, engineering, computing courses etc.
 Monterrey Institute of Technology and Higher Education, a university in Monterrey, México
 Muroran Institute of Technology, a college in Muroran, Hokkaido, Japan
 Musashi Institute of Technology, a college in Setagaya, Tokyo, Japan
 Muzaffarpur Institute of Technology, an engineering college in Muzaffarpur, Bihar, India

Other uses 
 Ministry of Information Technology (disambiguation)
 Made in Taiwan
 Myanmar Institute of Theology
 Made in Thailand, an album by Carabao
 Manzanillo International Terminal, Panama
 Market if touched, a type of order that will be executed when the price is touched 
 Massachusetts Investors Trust, a mutual fund founded in 1924 in the United States (see MFS Investment Management)
 Management of Information Technology, a postgraduate degree program at McIntire School of Commerce
 Master of Information Technology, an alternative title for a Master of Science in Information Technology degree
 Mechanoid Invasion Trilogy
 Melodic Intonation Therapy
 Metal–insulator transition
 Methylisothiazolinone, a preservative
 Millî İstihbarat Teşkilâtı (MİT), National Intelligence Organization of the Republic of Turkey
 Ministero delle Infrastrutture e dei Trasporti, the Italian Ministry of Infrastructure and Transport
 MIT BBS, a Chinese online forum
 MIT License, a license for the use of certain types of computer software
 MIT: Murder Investigation Team, a British television programme
 Monoiodotyrosine, a precursor to the thyroid hormones triiodothyronine (T3) and thyroxine (T4)
 Mujahidin Indonesia Timur, an Indonesian terrorist group 
 Murder Investigation Team, a British police homicide squad
 Metrocargo Intermodal Transport, a European Project partly founded by the EC
 Iwate Menkoi Television, an Iwate-based television broadcaster
 Multiple impact therapy, a group psychotherapy technique
Mit (butterfly), a genus of butterflies in the subtribe Moncina